Brunello Spinelli (May 26, 1939 – February 6, 2018) was an Italian water polo player who competed in the 1960 Summer Olympics.

In the 1960 Olympics water polo tournament he was a member of the Italian water polo team which won the gold medal. He played two matches as goalkeeper.

See also
 Italy men's Olympic water polo team records and statistics
 List of Olympic champions in men's water polo
 List of Olympic medalists in water polo (men)
 List of men's Olympic water polo tournament goalkeepers

References

External links
 
 

1939 births
2018 deaths
Italian male water polo players
Water polo goalkeepers
Water polo players at the 1960 Summer Olympics
Olympic gold medalists for Italy in water polo
Medalists at the 1960 Summer Olympics
Sportspeople from Florence
20th-century Italian people
21st-century Italian people